Fereydoon Moshiri (September 21, 1926 – October 24, 2000) was one of the prominent contemporary Persian poets who wrote poems in both modern and classic styles of the Persian poem.

A selection of his poems has been translated into English entitled With All my Tears by Ali Salami. Some of his other published works are as follows:
 1957, Gonah-e Darya (The Sin of the Sea)
 1958, Nayafteh (Undiscovered)
 1960, Abr (The Cloud)
 1970, Parvaz Ba Khorshid (Flying With the Sun)
 1978, Bahar ra Bavar Kon (Believe the Spring)
 1988, Ah Baran (Oh, the Rain)
 2001, Ta Sobh-e Tabnak-e Ahura'ii (Until the Bright of Ahuric Dawn)

Last years
Fereydoon Moshiri had been suffering from leukaemia and kidney failure for five years and died in "Tehran Clinic" hospital on October 24, 2000 at the age of 74.

References

External links
 Fereydoon Moshiri at Iran Chamber Society
 Fereydoon Moshiri's life
 Kooche by Darya Dadvar
 Koucheh (Alley), a poem written and read by Fereydoon Moshiri,  (4 min 6 sec). Text: Koucheh.

20th-century Iranian poets
Persian-language poets
People from Tehran
1926 births
2000 deaths
Burials at artist's block of Behesht-e Zahra
20th-century poets
Iranian male poets
20th-century male writers
Deaths from cancer in Iran
Deaths from leukemia